Karel Meijer (June 26, 1884 in Amsterdam – December 29, 1967 in Amstelveen) was a Dutch water polo player who competed in the 1908 Summer Olympics and in the 1920 Summer Olympics.

He was part of the Dutch water polo team, which finished fourth in the 1908 tournament. Twelve years later he was a member of the Dutch water polo team, which finished sixth in the 1920 tournament.

He is the younger brother of Eduard Meijer.

References

1884 births
1967 deaths
Dutch male water polo players
Water polo players at the 1908 Summer Olympics
Water polo players at the 1920 Summer Olympics
Olympic water polo players of the Netherlands
Water polo players from Amsterdam
20th-century Dutch people